Nazley Khan Sharif (born 18 May 1990) is a South African politician serving as the Shadow Deputy Minister of Women, Youth and Disabilities in the Presidency since June 2019. Sharif was elected to the National Assembly in the May 2019 general election. Khan is a member of the Democratic Alliance.

Education
Sharif studied at the University of the Witwatersrand, where she graduated with a BA degree and a BA Honours degree in political sciences.

Political career

While in her first year at the University of the Witwatersrand, she joined the Democratic Alliance Students' Organisation (DASO) on campus. She has been the deputy chairperson for Recruitment and Campaigns of DASO, the chair of the DA Youth in the party's Johannesburg South constituency, the chair of the DA Gauteng South Regional Youth Organisation, and the chairperson of the DASO branch at Wits University.

She was elected as a DA councillor in the City of Johannesburg Metropolitan Municipality in 2014. Khan was elected to a full term in 2016. She was then elected chairperson of the municipality's Section 79 Gender, Youth, and People with Disabilities committee.

Khan was elected to the National Assembly in the May 2019 general election. On 5 June 2019, she was appointed Shadow Deputy Minister of Women, Youth and Disabilities in the Presidency. She became a member of the Portfolio Committee on Women, Youth and People with Disabilities on 27 June 2019.

On 5 December 2020, it was announced that Khan would remain as Shadow Deputy Minister of Women, Youth and Disabilities in the Presidency in the shadow cabinet led by John Steenhuisen.

References

External links

Living people
1990 births
People from Johannesburg
University of the Witwatersrand alumni
Democratic Alliance (South Africa) politicians
Members of the National Assembly of South Africa
Women members of the National Assembly of South Africa